Hans-Hinrich Koch (born 1970 in Göttingen) is a German producer.

Prizes and awards 
 Nominated for the Prix Rose d'Or Award 2008 (“Dem kühlen Morgen entgegen”) 4th Human Rights Film Festival of Paris
 Awarded jury's special prize at the 4th Human Rights Film Festival of Paris (“Nachbarn”)
 Nominated for the Baden-Württemberg prize for best script (“Vom Atmen unter Wasser”)
 Judged “particularly worthwhile" by the Film evaluation authority (FBW) in Wiesbaden (“Vom Atmen unter Wasser”)
 Nominated for the "Deutscher Kamerapreis” in the documentary/documentary film category (“Kauf mich!”)
 Opening film and German contribution to the International Documentary Film Festival Munich in 2003 ("Rey Negro")
 Awarded “Documentary film of the month”, by the Film evaluation authority (FBW) in Wiesbaden (“Schwere Geburt”)
 Nominated for the FIRST STEPS Award 2009 & 2011 in the documentary film category (“Schwere Geburt” & “Kauf mich!”)
 Nominated for the PRIX EUROPA 2014, in the TV Fiction category (“Die Auserwählten”)
 Nominated for the Deutscher Hörfilmpreis (“Die Auserwählten”)
 Awarded “Best Film” at the ZOOM Igualada Festival Barcelona (“Die Auserwählten”)
 Awarded the “Gold World Medal” at the New York Festivals (“Die Auserwählten”)

Publications and articles 
 “The Effective mechanisms of international TV series” Wirkungsmechanismen internationaler TV-Serien. In: Uwe Kammann, Jochen Hörisch (Hrsg.): Organisierte Phantasie – Medienwelten im 21. Jahrhundert. Wilhelm Fink Verlag, Paderborn 2014, .
 Identität und Zuschauernähe – Die Sender brauchen deutsche Serien. Adolf-Grimme-Institut; Festschrift zum 44. Adolf-Grimme-Preis

External links 
 
 Hans-Hinrich Koch bei filmportal.de
 Hans-Hinrich Koch im Filmlexikon Zweitausendeins
 Hans-Hinrich Koch auf ndF.de
 Tsunami bricht Rekorde. In: mediabiz
 ProSieben gelingt beachtlicher Katastrophenfilm. In: Berliner Zeitung. 29. November 2005.

1970 births
Living people
German film producers
Mass media people from Göttingen
Film people from Lower Saxony